John Gale may refer to:

 John Gale (MP) (1516/17–1554), MP for Tavistock and Totnes
 John Gale (theologian) (1680–1721), British Baptist theologian
 John Gale (journalist) (1831–1929), Australian editor and founder of the Queanbeyan Age
 Jack Gale (1899–1975), Australian rules footballer
 John Gale (British journalist) (1925–1974)
 John Gale (theatre producer) (born 1929), English impresario 
 John A. Gale (born 1940), American politician from Nebraska
 John Gale (poker player) (1953–2019), British poker player
 Jack Gale (DJ) (fl. 1950s), disc jockey and discoverer of Ginny Wright
 John Gale (director) (fl. 1970s), Filipino contemporary B-movie director and actor

See also
 John Gayle (disambiguation)